Just One Kiss can mean:
 Just One Kiss (Exile song)
 Just One Kiss (Nick Carter song)
 Just One Kiss (CSI: Miami episode), an episode of CSI: Miami
 "Just One Kiss", song by Imelda May and Noel Gallagher from 11 Past the Hour
 "Jus 1 Kiss", a song by Basement Jaxx

See also
 Just One More Kiss (disambiguation) 
 Just a Kiss (disambiguation)